Ayanda Ngila (1992–2022), was a land activist, a prominent leader in the shack dweller's movement Abahlali baseMjondolo  and deputy chairperson of its eKhenana Commune. He was assassinated on 8 March 2022.

Arrest

eKhenana, a well known branch of the social movement Abahlali baseMjondolo, has been the target of repression for many years. In March 2021, Ayanda Ngila along with three other leaders of the movement, Lindokuhle Mnguni, Landu Shazi and Maphiwe Gasela, were arrested and charged with murder. In March 2021, Ayanda Ngila along with two other leaders of the movement, Lindokuhle Mnguni and Landu Shazi, were arrested and charged with murder. They were held without bail for six months before charges were eventually withdrawn by the state for lack of evidence on 1 October 2021. The arrests were part of a string of arrests of other Abahlali baseMjondolo leaders including Nokuthula Mabaso and Mqapheli Bonono, which have widely been referred to as politically motivated.

Retired Anglican bishop for KwaZulu-Natal, Rubin Phillip, reacted with concern at what he deemed to be another instance of false arrest of Abahlali baseMjondolo members. The Socio-Economic Rights Institute criticised the National Prosecuting Authority for not ensuring that Ngila and his co-accused received their constitutional right to a speedy bail application process. University of Johannesburg professor Jane Duncan noted the way the criminal justice system was being abused to break the community.

Assassination

Ngila was assassinated on 8 March 2022 by four attackers, while on his way to fix a water pipe at the eKhenana Commune, in Cato Manor, Durban, South Africa. His murder, which also targeted the settlement's chairperson, Lindokuhle Mnguni, is said to have been carried out by hit-men linked to the local taxi industry and local political leaders in the African National Congress.

Khaya Ngubane, the son of a local ANC politician, was later arrested for Ngila's murder. Nokuthula Mabaso, a state witness in Ngila's assassination was herself shot and killed on 5 May 2022. After Mabaso was killed, Ngubane was denied bail. On 20 August 2022 the second key witness in Ngila's murder, Lindokuhle Mnguni was also assassinated.

Reaction

The assassination was widely condemned by South African and internationally including in a widely publicised letter from over 130 civil society organisations. Prominent public interest law firm, the Socio-Economic Rights Institute of South Africa (SERI), called on the Minister of Police and the South African Human Rights Commission to investigate his assassination. 

The international human rights organisations that issued statements of concern included the Kairos Center in New York, the Habitat International Coalition, the International Network for Economic, Social and Cultural Rights and Frontline Defenders. 

The assassination of Abahlali baseMjondolo activists, including Ngila, was discussed at the 51st session of the United Nations Human Rights Council in 2022.

The assassination was also condemned by a host of popular organisations across Africa including the eSwatini republican movement PUDEMO whose leader attended Ngila's funeral, the Socialist Movement of Ghana the South African Federation of Trade Unions as well as the largest trade union in the country, the National Union of Metalworkers of South Africa.

See also

 Nokuthula Mabaso
 Lindokuhle Mnguni

Notes and references

See also
 Abahlali baseMjondolo
 List of unsolved murders
 Political assassinations in post-apartheid South Africa
 Political repression in post-apartheid South Africa
 List of assassinated human rights activists

2022 murders in South Africa
Abahlali baseMjondolo members
Assassinated South African activists
People murdered in South Africa
Shack dwellers
South African activists
Squatter leaders
21st-century squatters
Unsolved murders in South Africa